USNS Lewis and Clark (T-AKE-1) is an American dry cargo ship, the lead ship of her namesake class. It was the second ship of the United States Navy to be named for the explorers Meriwether Lewis and William Clark. The contract to build her was awarded to National Steel and Shipbuilding Company (NASSCO) of San Diego, California, on 18 October 2001 and her keel was laid down on 22 April 2004. She was launched on 21 May 2005, co-sponsored by Jane Lewis Sale Henley and Lisa Clark, descendants of the ship's namesakes. She was delivered to the Navy on 20 June 2006.

Description

The T-AKE is a replenishment naval vessel operated by Military Sealift Command with civilian mariner crews (53 personnel) augmented by a military department (5 personnel). In 2012, Lewis and Clark became one of 14 ships that comprise the United States Marine Corps (USMC) Maritime Prepositioning Program (MPP).

Replenishment ships help allow the Marine Corps maintain a forward presence. Her primary mission is the delivery of supplies to enable the arrival and assembly of a Marine Expeditionary Brigade (MEB). The T-AKE transfers cargo – ammunition, food, fuel, repair parts, ship store items and expendable supplies to Marine and joint forces ashore.

The Navy awarded National Steel and Shipbuilding Company of San Diego, Calif., a $406.9 million competitive contract 18 October 2001, to build the first ship of the class, USNS Lewis and Clark. The Navy also exercised a $301.6 million option in the contract for the construction of the second ship of the class, .

The U.S. Navy had previously fielded a ballistic missile submarine named .

Antipiracy

In February 2009, the ship was deployed off the coast of Somalia as part of Operation Enduring Freedom - Horn of Africa. The vessel was fitted out to be used as a prison ship for captured pirates.

On 20 November 2010, the Lewis and Clark responded to a distress call by the Chinese-flagged cargo ship M/V Tai An Kou which was under attack by Somalian pirates. Upon sighting the US naval vessel, the pirates opened fire and the Lewis and Clark returned fire in a brief engagement that drove the pirates off without causing any casualties. The destroyer  then also arrived on the scene 10 hours later and launched a helicopter to provide additional assistance until the PLAN frigate Xuzhou arrived.

References

External links 

 msc.navy.mil: USNS Lewis and Clark 

 

Lewis and Clark-class dry cargo ships
Bulk carriers of the United States Navy
Prison ships
2005 ships